Alfredo Rojas may refer to:

 Alfredo Rojas (Argentine footballer) (born 1937)
 Alfredo Rojas (Chilean footballer) (born 1985)
 Alfredo Rojas (Peruvian footballer) (born 1991)